Jack (sometimes called Jack the Explorer) is a 3D-animated TV series broadcast by TVOntario as a part of its TVOKids lineup. It is about an alien named Jack and a brother and sister who make friends with him, while hiding his existence from their parents. First created in 2009, its TV premiere was scheduled for September 5, 2011, but was actually aired two days later. As of October 21, 2014, there are at least 39 22-minute episodes in the series, each consisting of two 11-minute segments, with a total of 78 individually-named stories.

Plot 
Jack is a fun-loving alien explorer whose coolest discovery yet is the amazing, planet Earth! With the help of his alien dog Rocket and his robotic assistant C.H.I.P., he sets out on a series of fun and daring adventures to learn all about this strange new planet! Showing him the ropes are his three new friends: a nine-year-old boy named Nico, his little sister Sam, and their slacker pal Yoki. Together they help Jack (and us) understand how things work here on Earth...and beyond!

Characters

Aliens 
Jack the Alien (voiced by Rick Jones)
Rocket the Dog (voiced by Rick Jones)
C.H.I.P. the Computer (voiced by Dawn Ford)
High Commander (voiced by Kathleen Fee)

Earthlings 
Nico (voiced by Eleanor Noble) – The 9-year-old elder brother.
Sam (voiced by Holly Gauthier-Frankel) – The younger sister.
The siblings' mom (voiced by Claudia Besso)
The siblings' dad (voiced by Terrence Scammell)
Yoki (voiced by Holly Gauthier-Frankel) – The siblings' black-haired slacker pal.
Mrs. Weebler (voiced by Gayle Garfinkle) – The nosey next door neighbor and a very serious woman.
Dr. Molecule,

Episodes
Note: All episodes are directed by Steven Majaury.

Season 1 (2011)

Season 2 (2012)

Season 3 (2014)

References

External links
TVO description
TVO Kids page
Games

2010s Canadian animated television series
2011 Canadian television series debuts
2014 Canadian television series endings
Canadian children's animated science fantasy television series
Canadian computer-animated television series
Canadian preschool education television series
TVO original programming
Animated television series about children
Animated preschool education television series
2010s preschool education television series